The Maui natural gas field is the largest gas, natural gas condensate and oil field in New Zealand, producing nearly three-quarters of the country's hydrocarbons, as well as providing energy for electricity generation. It is located in the Tasman Sea, 35 km off the coast of Taranaki and to the southwest of New Plymouth. It covers an area of 157 square kilometres and is located in 110 metres of water.

The gas field was discovered in 1969 by a joint venture of Royal Dutch/Shell, British Petroleum and Todd Petroleum.  It was considered a "giant" field at the time of discovery. Government investment led to a government organisation later called Petrocorp taking a 50% interest. This was later bought out by Fletcher Challenge Energy.  By the end of the Maui gas contract in 2009, the Maui Mining Companies were made up of Shell (83.75%), OMV New Zealand (10%), and Todd Energy (6.25%). OMV New Zealand owns and operates the Maui gas field having acquired the 83.75% share from Shell Exploration NZ and the 6.25% share from Todd Energy since the end of 2018.

Two platforms operate in the field: full production from Maui A began in 1979; Maui B was installed 13 years later. Much of the gas from Maui was used to supply the Motunui synthetic petrol plant from 1986 until it ceased operation in 2004. An onshore naphtha refining plant was installed in 1999. The floating production storage and offloading vessel Whakaaropai was installed as part of the final development phases in 1996, for the production of oil from Maui B. It was sold in 2005 when the recoverable oil reserves had been exhausted.

Gas is piped to power stations for electricity generation at Stratford and Huntly. Electricity production from the gas grew steadily from the 1970s, with it providing 30% of New Zealand's electricity in 2002. Production declined in the 2000s as the gas was depleted, providing just 16% of the country's electricity in 2005. The gas is also distributed through high-pressure pipelines for industrial and domestic use around the North Island. This used 30% of the gas produced in 2005.

In 2005, the Maui fields oil reserves were estimated to be 92% depleted, and the Maui field gas reserves were estimated to be 91% depleted.

In 2014, the New Zealand government revised its published estimates of natural gas reserves. "The biggest news of the recalculation involves one of the oldest gas producers. When the offshore Maui field was discovered in 1969 and
developed 10 years later, it was forecast it would be exhausted in 30 years. But now its remaining proved reserves have been doubled to 133 PJ
and its 2P reserves more than doubled to 466 PJ".

See also 
 Energy in New Zealand
 Oil and gas industry in New Zealand

References

External links
Field summary at Todd Energy website

Zealandia
Geography of Taranaki
Geography of the New Zealand seabed
Oil fields of New Zealand
Natural gas fields in New Zealand
Buildings and structures in Taranaki
Todd Corporation